{{Infobox person
| name       =  Julie Cobb
| image      =  Julie Cobb.jpg
| image_size  =
| caption    =  Cobb in 1977
| birth_name  = Julie Frances Cobb
| birth_date  =  
| birth_place = Los Angeles, California, U.S.
| death_date  =
| death_place =
| education   = Beverly Hills High School
| alma_mater  = San Francisco State College
| known_for   = Charles in ChargeGrowing PainsAfter the Fall| occupation  = Actress
| yearsactive = 1968–present
| spouse      = 
| children = 
| father = Lee J. Cobb
| mother = Helen Beverley
}}

Julie Frances Cobb is an American actress. She is the daughter of actor Lee J. Cobb.

Early life
Cobb was born in Los Angeles, California, to a Jewish family. Her parents were actor Lee J. Cobb and actress Helen Beverley. She went to Beverly Hills High School and attended San Francisco State College for two years. Before she became an actress, she was a receptionist, taught English in Mexico City, and for a few months worked as a Playboy bunny.

 Career 
Cobb's career, which lasted over forty years, mostly consisted of guest appearances on television shows. Her first credited role was in an episode of Star Trek entitled "By Any Other Name", which was first broadcast on February 23, 1968. (She was the only female Redshirt to be killed in the original series.) She appeared on Gunsmoke (1974), Season 20, Ep 13, "The Colonel", as the painfully reunited daughter of a once proud military officer. The Colonel was portrayed by Julie Cobb's real life father, actor Lee J. Cobb. She appeared on The Brady Bunch (1971), Season 2, Ep 18, "Our Son The Man", as Greg Brady's high school interest. She also played the matriarch of the Pembroke family on the first season of the sitcom Charles in Charge, and also appeared on the short-lived series The D.A..

Her film career has included roles in The Second Coming of Suzanne (1974), Just You and Me, Kid (1979), The Runnin' Kind (1989), Lisa (1990), Defending Your Life (1991) and Dr. Jekyll and Ms. Hyde (1995). She also appeared in the TV movie versions of Salem's Lot (1979) and Brave New World (1980). As a stage actress, she won the L.A. Drama Critics Award for her role in a stage production of Arthur Miller's play After the Fall''.

Personal life
Cobb married actor James Cromwell on May 29, 1986; he filed for a divorce in 2005.

Filmography

References

External links
 
 

Living people
American film actresses
American stage actresses
American television actresses
Actresses from Los Angeles
Jewish American actresses
American people of Russian-Jewish descent
20th-century American actresses
21st-century American actresses
21st-century American Jews
Year of birth missing (living people)